The maximum density of a substance is the highest attainable density of the substance under given conditions.

Attaining maximum density
Almost all known substances undergo thermal expansion in response to heating, meaning that a given mass of substance contracts to a low volume at low temperatures, when little thermal energy is present.  Substances, especially fluids in which intermolecular forces are weak, also undergo compression upon the application of pressure.  Nearly all substances therefore reach a density maximum at very low temperatures and very high pressures, characteristic properties of the solid state of matter.

Water

This has important ramifications in Earth's ecosystem.

References

See also

 List of elements by density
 Density
 Specific Gravity
 Specific weight
 Charge density
 Buoyancy
 Hydrometer

Density
Condensed matter physics
Physical chemistry
Physical quantities